Anfernee is a modern phonetic given name variant of Anthony that was popularized by Penny Hardaway. It was among the top 2000 most popular baby names in the United States from 1993 to 1999. Hardaway was drafted in the 1993 NBA draft and was an NBA All-Star from 1995-1998. Notable people with the given name include:

Given name
Anfernee Dijksteel (born 1996), Dutch footballer
Anfernee Frederick (born 1996), Dominican footballer
Anfernee Grier (born 1995), American baseball player
Anfernee Jennings (born 1997), American gridiron football player
Anfernee "Penny" Hardaway (born 1971), American basketball player and coach
Anfernee Seymour (born 1995), Bahamian baseball player
Anfernee Simons (born 1999), American basketball player

Middle name
Raheem Nathaniel Anfernee Edwards, full name of Raheem Edwards (born 1995), Canadian soccer player
Dennis Anfernee Santana Sánchez, full name of Dennis Santana (born 1996), Dominican baseball player

See also

Anthony, a name pronounced somewhat similarly

Notes